Cameron Jackson Woodward (born 8 January 1985 in Mildura, Victoria) is an Australian speedway rider who has won the Victorian State Championship on three occasions.

Career
A product of junior speedway at the Olympic Park Speedway in Mildura (where the likes of Phil Crump, Jason Crump and Leigh Adams learnt their trade), Woodward gained experience of racing in Australia before starting his British speedway career in 2003 with Elite League Poole Pirates, and initially combined speedway racing with his job back in Australia as a plumber. He then spent the 2004 and 2005 seasons in the Premier League with Edinburgh Monarchs, his average rising to over 7. He returned to the Elite League with Eastbourne Eagles in 2006, and after rising through the team, in a spell when the team won the Elite League Knockout Cup in 2008 and the Elite Shield in 2009, was given the team captaincy in 2010, and has remained with the team since.

In 2008 and 2009 he also rode the Polish Ekstraliga for Stal Rzeszów, moving on to Miskolc in 2010. Since 2011 he rides for KMŻ Lublin.

Woodward first won the Victoria State Championship in the 2005/6 season and won it again in 2007/8 and 2008/9. In 2012 he finished in 3rd place in the Australian National Championship.

Woodward also competes in long track speedway, and took part in the World Championship in 2012, finishing in 6th place overall.

He also competes in grasstrack racing, and won the British Masters Championship in 2012.

Woodward was the 2014 South Australian Champion, winning the title at Adelaide's Gillman Speedway on 7 December 2013.

Woodward's 2014 season was ended by a broken femur sustained in a crash while riding in Poland in September. While it was anticipated that he would be fit for the start of the 2015 season, and after signing for Coventry Bees, Indianerna and Lokomotiv Daugavpils in January a check-up revealed that the break hadn't healed and a bone graft would be required, meaning that he would miss the early part of the season.

Championship record
Australian Championship: 3rd (2012)
Victoria State Championship: Won 2005/6, 2007/8, 2008/9
Australian Under-21 Championship: 2nd (2003), 3rd (2005)

World Longtrack Championship

Grand-Prix Series
 2012 - 6 apps (9th) 74pts
 2013 - 6 apps (6th) 90pts
 2014 - 3 apps (15th) 12pts

Best results
  Rzeszow Second 2013
  Vechta Third 2012, 2013

Team Championship
 2013  Folkestone (5th) 25/36pts (Rode with Hunter Anderson, Rodney McDonald)

British Masters Grasstrack Championship
 2012  Frittenden (Champion)
 2013  Wimborne (Champion)

References

External links

 http://grasstrackgb.co.uk/cameron-woodward/

1985 births
Living people
Australian speedway riders
Poole Pirates riders
Edinburgh Monarchs riders
Eastbourne Eagles riders